The cinnamon-breasted tit (Melaniparus pallidiventris) is passerine bird in the family Paridae. It is found in Tanzania, Malawi, Mozambique and Zimbabwe. Its natural habitat is miombo woodland.

The cinnamon-breasted tit was described by the German ornithologist Anton Reichenow in 1885 based on a specimen collected at Kakoma in the Tabora Region of Tanzania. He coined the binomial name Parus pallidiventris. The specific epithet combines the Latin pallidus "pale"  and venter, ventris "belly". It was formerly one of the many species placed in the genus Parus. It was moved to the resurrected genus Melaniparus based on the results of a molecular phylogenetic study published in 2013. The genus Melaniparus had been introduced by the French naturalist Charles Lucien Bonaparte in 1850.

The cinnamon-breasted tit has sometimes been considered conspecific with the rufous-bellied tit, (Melaniparus rufiventris). It was formerly generally believed that rufous-bellied tits had pale eyes and the cinnamon-breasted tits dark eyes. A study published in 2015 found that in western Tanzania birds with dark eyes and pale eyes occurred in the same flocks. This suggests that it might be better to consider the cinnamon-breasted tit as a subspecies of the rufous-bellied tit.    
 
Two subspecies are recognised:
 M. p. pallidiventris (Reichenow, 1885) – Tanzania, south Malawi and north Mozambique
 M. p. stenotopicus (Clancey, 1989) – east Zimbabwe and west central Mozambique

References

cinnamon-breasted tit
cinnamon-breasted tit